"Island of Lost Souls" is a song recorded by the band Blondie and released as the lead single from their sixth studio album, The Hunter, in April 1982.

Song information and chart success
Continuing the band's penchant for spanning different genres of music, including rock, disco, reggae and rap/hip-hop (all of which had given the band No. 1 hits), "Island of Lost Souls" saw Blondie delve into calypso music. The song was recorded in the autumn of 1981, and promotional copies of the single were sent to U.S. radio stations on 31 October 1981.

Upon its release in 1982, "Island of Lost Souls" was not one of Blondie's biggest hits, only reaching the Top 10 in Belgium, although it did top the Canadian RPM Adult Contemporary chart. It peaked at No. 37 on the Billboard Hot 100 (becoming Blondie's final U.S. Top 40 hit on that chart to date), and also reached No. 11 in the United Kingdom.

Music video
The music video was filmed in the Isles of Scilly in the UK. It features three scenes interspersed with each other: a group of men dressed as undertakers in a Cornish gig boat, the band dressed in white monk robes (the members apart from Harry play horns and saxophones while wearing fish masks), and the band dressed as a Latin American band.

Track listing
US 7"  (CHS 2603, April 1982)
UK 7"  (CHS 2608 & 7" Picture Disc CHSP 2608, April 1982)
"Island of Lost Souls" (7" edit) (Deborah Harry, Chris Stein) – 3:49 
"Dragonfly" (Harry, Stein) – 5:47
UK 12"  (12 CHS 2608, April 1982)
"Island of Lost Souls" (Album version) (Harry, Stein) – 4:44
"Dragonfly" (Harry, Stein) – 5:47

Chart performance

Covers
Brazilian singer and hostess Mara Maravilha recorded a Portuguese version of the song titled "Na Ilha dos Sonhos Perdidos", on her 1990 album Deixa a Vida Rolar.

References

1982 singles
Blondie (band) songs
Songs written by Debbie Harry
Songs written by Chris Stein
Song recordings produced by Mike Chapman
1981 songs
Chrysalis Records singles